Right as Rain is a 2001 crime novel by George Pelecanos. It is set in Washington DC and focuses on private investigator Derek Strange and his new partner Terry Quinn. It is the first novel to involve the characters and is followed by Hell to Pay (2002), Soul Circus (2003) and Hard Revolution (2004).

Plot introduction
The novel follows private investigator Derek Strange as he works on several cases in Washington DC. Strange's main case is to investigate the death of Chris Wilson. Strange focuses on ex-cop Terry Quinn who shot Wilson. Both were police officers and the shooting led to Quinn's discharge from the police department. The shooting was high profile and characterised as racially motivated; Quinn is caucasian while Wilson was African American. Quinn becomes involved in the investigation himself as he is desperate to clear his conscience.

Explanation of the novel's title
The internal police investigation of Quinn's shooting of Wilson determined that Quinn was blameless, that the shooting was "right as rain."

Characters

Derek Strange is an ex-cop and current private investigator. Strange has a successful business and is a lifelong resident of Washington DC.

Terry Quinn is an ex police officer discharged after the fatal shooting of Chris Wilson, the victim in the case which brings Strange and Quinn together.

Major themes

Race is a major theme of the novel.

Footnotes

2001 American novels
Novels by George Pelecanos
Little, Brown and Company books
Novels set in Washington, D.C.